The RT1 is a line of Rodalies de Catalunya's Tarragona commuter rail service, operated by Renfe Operadora. It links Reus railway station in the city of Reus with Tarragona railway station, in the city center of Tarragona. RT1 services started operating in 2014, becoming the first commuter service to use the Tarragona-Lleida railway, originally designed to serve regional as well as inter-city rail.

List of stations
The following table lists the name of each station served by line RT1 in order from west to east; the station's service pattern offered by RT2 trains; the transfers to other Rodalies de Catalunya lines, including both commuter and regional rail services; remarkable transfers to other transport systems; the municipality in which each station is located; and the fare zone each station belongs to according to the Autoritat del Transport Metropolità (ATM Àrea de Barcelona) fare-integrated public transport system and Rodalies de Catalunya's own fare zone system for Barcelona commuter rail service lines.

References

External links
 Rodalies de Catalunya official website
 Schedule for the RT1 (PDF format)
 RT1 Rodalies (rodt2cat) on Twitter. Official Twitter account by Rodalies de Catalunya for the RT1 with service status updates (tweets usually published only in Catalan)
 
 RT1 (rodalia T1) on Twitter. Unofficial Twitter account by Rodalia.info monitoring real-time information about the RT1 by its users.
 Information about the RT1 at trenscat.cat 

T1
Railway services introduced in 2014